Darkhorse is the second studio album by American rap rock band Crazy Town, released on November 12, 2002. The album peaked at No. 120 on the Billboard 200 and No. 164 in the UK. It sold less than 13,000 units in its first week.

Crazy Town stated they were not personally disappointed that the album did not sell as well as their last, The Gift of Game, considering they were moving the band in a new direction, away from the pop success they achieved with their number 1 song "Butterfly". Crazy Town broke up several months after the album's release, citing amongst other things including pressure from their record company for a "Butterfly" follow-up.

The second and final single, "Hurt You So Bad", features Rivers Cuomo from Weezer on the track's guitar solo.

Track listing

(Tracks 12 to 22 and 24 to 31 are blank)

Personnel
Crazy Town
Bret Mazur – lead vocals, keyboards
Shifty Shellshock – lead vocals
Kraig Tyler – guitar, backing vocals
Anthony Valli – guitar
Doug Miller – bass
Kyle Hollinger – drums

Additional musicians
Rivers Cuomo – guitar solo on "Hurt You So Bad"

Production
Howard Benson – producer, keyboards
Mike Plotnikoff – recording, digital editing, engineer
Eric Miller – engineer
Keith Armstrong – assistant engineer
Chris Lord-Alge – mixing
Ted Jensen – mastering at Sterling Sound in New York

Charts

References

2002 albums
Crazy Town albums
Albums produced by Howard Benson